Hayward is an unincorporated community in Mariposa County, California, United States.

References

External links
Zip Code 95329 Map and Profile
Sunrise and Sunset times for Hayward, Mariposa County, California

Unincorporated communities in California
Unincorporated communities in Mariposa County, California